The St. Lucia threadsnake (Tetracheilostoma breuili) is a species of blind snake in the family Leptotyphlopidae. The species is native to the West Indies.

Etymology
The specific name, breuili, is in honor of French herpetologist Michel Breuil.

Geographic range
T. breuili is endemic to the Caribbean island-nation of Saint Lucia.

Habitat

Description
It is dark brown with two yellowish lateral stripes, like the closely related L. bilineatus (Martinique) and L. carlae (Barbados). It differs from those two species by having two spots behind its head, and a dark tail.

Reproduction
T. breuili is oviparous.

References

External links

Leptotyphlops breuili  at the Encyclopedia of Life

Further reading
Adalsteinsson SA, Branch WR, Trape S, Vitt LJ, Hedges SB (2009). "Molecular phylogeny, classification, and biogeography of snakes of the family Leptotyphlopidae (Reptilia, Squamata)". Zootaxa 2244: 1-50. (Tracheilostoma breuili, new combination).

Tetracheilostoma
Snakes of the Caribbean
Endemic fauna of Saint Lucia
Reptiles of Saint Lucia
Reptiles described in 2008